Dejan Milošeski (born 27 December 1982 in Skopje) is a Macedonian retired football player.

Career

Club
He was released from Widzew Łódź on 2 July 2011 and he joined Panachaiki GE on a free transfer.

Summer 2012 joined Kentavros Magoulas on a free transfer

In July 2013 he joined Olympiakos Savalion, a club that plays in the first division of the local amateur championship of the Elis regional unit.

International
He made his senior debut and played his only international for Macedonia in a November 2008 friendly match against Montenegro.

References

External links
 
 

1982 births
Living people
Footballers from Skopje
Association football midfielders
Macedonian footballers
North Macedonia international footballers
FK Cementarnica 55 players
FK Vėtra players
Widzew Łódź players
Górnik Łęczna players
Panachaiki F.C. players
Macedonian First Football League players
A Lyga players
I liga players
Football League (Greece) players
Macedonian expatriate footballers
Expatriate footballers in Lithuania
Macedonian expatriate sportspeople in Lithuania
Expatriate footballers in Poland
Macedonian expatriate sportspeople in Poland
Expatriate footballers in Greece
Macedonian expatriate sportspeople in Greece